The Tudjuh Archipelago (lit. "Seven Islands") is a large group of islands in north-western Indonesia, off the west and north-west coast of the island of Borneo in the South China Sea. Administratively the islands belong to the Riau Islands province of Indonesia. The Tudjuh Archipelago consists of four island groups, the Badas Islands, the Tambelan Islands, the Natuna Islands, and the Anambas Islands.

Notes

Further reading
 National Geospatial-intelligence Agency (2005) "Borneo: Northwest Coast and Kepulauan Tudjuh" Sailing directions (enroute): Borneo, Jawa, Sulawesi, and Nusa Tenggara United States National Geospatial-Intelligence Agency

 
Landforms of the Riau Islands
Archipelagoes of Indonesia
Islands of Sumatra